Cymothoe hyarbita, the creamy yellow glider, is a butterfly in the family Nymphalidae. It is found in Nigeria, Cameroon, the Republic of the Congo and the Democratic Republic of the Congo.

The larvae feed on Dichapetalum and Caloncoba species.

Subspecies
Cymothoe hyarbita hyarbita (eastern Nigeria, Cameroon, western Congo)
Cymothoe hyarbita hyarbitina Aurivillius, 1897 (eastern Congo, Democratic Republic of the Congo)

Gallery

References

Butterflies described in 1866
Cymothoe (butterfly)
Butterflies of Africa
Taxa named by William Chapman Hewitson